Wulf Raeck (born 1950) is a German archaeologist, specializing in classical archaeology.

Education
Wulf Raeck studied at the University of Bonn, Hamburg University, and the University of Göttingen. His areas of study were classical archaeology, ancient history, classical philology, and art history.

His doctoral dissertation, 1980 (published 1981), was about the portrayal of barbarians in Athenian art in the sixth and fifth centuries B.C.

He received a travel fellowship from the German Archaeological Institute  for 1980-1981, traveling through the Mediterranean.

Professional career

After his travels, Raeck received an appointment at the Institute for Classical Archaeology at the University of Munich, where he wrote his habilitation (1987; published 1992) on classic picture themes in late antiquity.

In 1994, he took a position in classical archaeology at Greifswald University. Two years later, he transferred  to a post at Frankfurt University, where he held a teaching position  in classical archaeology until 2015.

Research

Raeck participated in Wolfgang Radt's excavation at Pergamon from 1972 through 1975.  From 1982 through 1995, he directed the restoration of the Pergamon Trajaneum.  In addition, he has led the digs at Priene since 1998, where he directs the Deutsche Forschungsgemeinschaft's project on urban development and housing and living conditions in ancient Priene as well The Hellenistic Polis as a Form of Life: Priene project.

Selected publications

 Zum Barbarenbild in der Kunst Athens im 6. und 5. Jahrhundert v. Chr. Habelt: Bonn 1981 (Habelts Dissertationsdrucke. Reihe Klassische Archäologie, H. 14), 
 Modernisierte Mythen. Zum Umgang der Spätantike mit klassischen Bildthemen Steiner: Stuttgart 1992,  .
 Editor with Christoff Neumeister. Rede und Redner. Bewertung und Darstellung in den antiken Kulturen. Bibliopolis: Möhnesee 2000 (Frankfurter Archäologische Schriften, Bd. 1),  .
 Editor with Dirk Steuernagel. Das Gebaute und das Gedachte. Siedlungsform, Architektur und Gesellschaft in prähistorischen und antiken Kulturen. Habelt, Bonn 2012 (Frankfurter Archäologische Schriften, Bd. 21),  .
 Editor with C. Becker. Guido von Kaschnitz-Weinberg. Gelehrter zwischen Archäologie und Politik. Frankfurt a. M. 2016.
 "Das dritte nachchristliche Jahrhundert in der archäologischen Forschung und Bewertung. Das Beispiel des Porträts," in: A. Eich et al. (eds.), Das dritte Jahrhundert. Kontinuitäten, Brüche, Übergänge (Stuttgart 2017), pp. 15 – 33.

References

1950 births
Living people
German archaeologists
University of Bonn alumni
University of Göttingen alumni
Academic staff of the University of Greifswald
University of Hamburg alumni